The Beck and R.C. Cahill Buildings [sic] was a historic commercial building on the southern side of downtown Lima, Ohio, United States.  Built in 1890 in a late version of the Victorian style, the building was located along Main Street south of the city's central square. It appears that the buildings no longer exist.

Origins
Lima grew rapidly in the last years of the 19th century following the nearby discovery of petroleum in 1885.  Many large commercial buildings were constructed in the city, including several on South Main Street such as the Martin and Kibby Blocks, the Dorsey Building, the Linneman Building, the Beck and Cahill Buildings, and the Adgate Block.

Architecture
Three large bays composed the first front of the three-story building, which was built of yellow brick and covered with a pyramid-shaped slate roof.  The upper floors of the square building comprised thirteen bays on two sides and seventeen bays on the others.  Decorative elements on the exterior included pilasters of cast iron and limestone quoins and trimming.  Into the 1970s, two of the original three storefronts remained essentially as they had been since the building was constructed.

Recent history
In 1982, the Beck and R.C. Cahill Buildings was one of eighteen historic buildings in or near downtown Lima to be listed on the National Register of Historic Places.  This collection, known as the "Lima Multiple Resource Area," embraced commercial and governmental buildings in the city constructed between 1860 and 1928.  Among the other buildings included in the Multiple Resource Area were several on South Main Street, including the adjacent Linneman Building and Martin and Kibby Blocks.

Despite this recognition, the Beck and R.C. Cahill Buildings is no longer in existence: it has been torn down, and a parking lot now occupies its place.

References

National Register of Historic Places in Allen County, Ohio
Buildings and structures completed in 1890
1890s architecture in the United States
Demolished buildings and structures in Ohio
Buildings and structures in Lima, Ohio
Commercial buildings on the National Register of Historic Places in Ohio
Victorian architecture in Ohio